Konistres is a village and a former municipality in Euboea, Greece. Since a local government reform in 2011, it has been part of the municipality of Kymi-Aliveri, of which it is a municipal unit. The municipal unit has an area of 127.559 km2. Population 3,023 (2011). Konistres emanates from the ancient word "Konistra". Konistra means palaistra (in Greek), which is a wrestling pitch.

External links
Konistra Official Website

References

Populated places in Euboea